Voraptus tenellus is a species of spider that is endemic to Mahé and Silhouette Island of Seychelles.

References

Endemic fauna of Seychelles
Miturgidae
Spiders of Africa
Spiders described in 1893